Shah Qoli (also Romanized as Shāh Qolī; also known as Shāhqolī) is a village in Zagheh Rural District, Zagheh District, Khorramabad County, Lorestan Province, Iran. At the 2006 census, its population was 102, in 27 families.

References 

Towns and villages in Khorramabad County